Terrycina Andrea "Terri" Sewell (born January 1, 1965) is an American lawyer and politician.

A native of Huntsville, Sewell studied at Princeton University, Harvard Law School, and St Hilda's College at the University of Oxford. Before entering politics, she was a securities lawyer for Davis Polk & Wardwell and a public finance lawyer for Maynard, Cooper & Gale, where she was the first Black woman to make partner. She is the first African-American woman elected to Congress from Alabama and, along with Republican Martha Roby, was one of the first women elected to Congress from Alabama in a regular election. Sewell has been the only Democrat in Alabama's House delegation during her entire term in office, and, apart from Doug Jones's tenure as a U.S. senator from 2018 to 2021, she has also been the state's only congressional Democrat.

Early life and education

Terri Sewell was born in Huntsville, Alabama, to Andrew A. Sewell, a former high school basketball coach, and Nancy Gardner Sewell, a retired high school librarian and former Selma city council member. Her mother was the first Black woman elected to Selma's city council.

As a child, Sewell wanted to be a star on Broadway. Because her mother had hoped for her to become a lawyer, Sewell joined the debate team in high school. She was the first Black valedictorian of Selma High School.

After graduating from high school, Sewell went to Princeton University. She was the first Selma High School graduate to attend an Ivy League school. She was recruited to attend Princeton by Julian L. McPhillips, who read about her in the local Selma newspaper. At Princeton, she befriended Michelle Obama, who served as what Sewell called her "big sister" on campus. Sewell completed a 158-page long senior thesis, "Black Women in Politics: Our Time Has Come". During her time at Princeton, she interned with Richard Shelby (then a Democrat) and Howell Heflin.

After graduating from Princeton in 1986, Sewell attended Oxford University where she was a Marshall Scholar. It was there that she befriended Susan Rice. Her master's thesis, on the election of the first black members of the British parliament, was later published as a book, Black Tribunes: Race and Representation in British Politics (1993). Sewell graduated from Oxford with a degree in political science in 1988. She attended Harvard Law School for her J.D. degree, which she completed in 1992. There she overlapped with and was friends with Barack Obama, who became a lifelong friend and influenced Sewell's decision to enter politics.

Early career
After graduation, Sewell served as a judicial law clerk in Birmingham, Alabama, to Chief Judge U. W. Clemon, In New York, she worked at Davis Polk & Wardwell, alongside Kirsten Gillibrand, starting in 1994.

Sewell returned to Alabama in 2004 due to her father's health problems. She worked for another law firm, Maynard, Cooper & Gale PC, where she was the first black woman partner at the firm. She was a public finance lawyer.

In 2007, Sewell was at Brown Chapel A.M.E. Church, where she is a member, when then Senator Barack Obama spoke during the 2008 United States presidential election. Sewell credits Obama's speech (in which he asked "[t]he questions that I have today is, what’s called of us in this Joshua generation? What do we do in order to fulfill that legacy, to fulfill the obligations and the debt that we owe to those who allowed us to be here today?") as the catalyst for her serving in politics. Weeks after his speech, Gillibrand called Sewell, recruiting Sewell to run for office.

U.S. House of Representatives

Elections

2010 

After four-term Democratic incumbent Artur Davis gave up the seat to run for governor, Sewell entered the Democratic primary—the real contest in this majority Democratic, majority-black district. She finished first in the four-way primary with 36.8% of the vote. In the runoff, she defeated Jefferson County commissioner Sheila Smoot with 55% of the vote.

In the general election, Sewell defeated Republican opponent Don Chamberlain with 72.4% of the vote.

2012 

Sewell was the only candidate to file for the Democratic nomination in 2012, and defeated Chamberlain again in the general election. She has not had a Republican opponent since.

2014 

Sewell was challenged in the Democratic primary by Tamara Harris Johnson, a former Birmingham City Attorney. She defeated Johnson with 83.9% of the vote, effectively clinching a third term.

2016 

Sewell won a fourth term against a write-in opponent.

2018 

Sewell won a fifth term against a write-in opponent.

2020 

Sewell won a sixth term against a write-in opponent.

2022 

Sewell defeated Republican nominee Beatrice Nichols and Libertarian nominee Gavin Goodman in the general election, clinching her seventh term.

Tenure

For the 114th United States Congress, Sewell was ranked as the 94th most bipartisan member of the House (and the most bipartisan member of the House from Alabama) in the Bipartisan Index created by The Lugar Center and the McCourt School of Public Policy, which ranks members of Congress by their degree of bipartisanship (by measuring how often each member's bills attract co-sponsors from the opposite party and each member co-sponsors bills by members of the opposite party). Sewell has established herself as a liberal with a focus on job creation, and arguably has the most left-wing voting record of any person to represent Alabama in Congress. She is a member of the Congressional Black Caucus.

In January 2020, Sewell endorsed Joe Biden for president.

As of October 2021, Sewell had voted in line with Biden's stated position 100% of the time.

Political positions

Abortion and women's issues

Sewell supports abortion rights. Sewell opposed the Human Life Protection Act, which went into effect in 2019. She described the bill as "both blatantly unconstitutional and a brazen, extremist attack on women’s rights." She also opposed the 2022 overturning of Roe v. Wade, calling it "devastating" and expressing concern that "state legislatures across the country will now begin racing to criminalize reproductive health care."

In 2013, Sewell voted to reauthorize the Violence Against Women Act.

Economic issues

Sewell is a proponent of a $15 minimum wage.

In 2019, she voted for the Paycheck Fairness Act, an act to address the gender pay gap.

Sewell supports tariffs on countries involved in currency manipulation. She voted for the Currency Reform for Fair Trade Act 2010.

Sewell supported Obama's plan to extend tax cuts for low- and middle-income Americans, but declined to discuss her stance on taxation for high-income Americans. In response to Obama's Framework for Business Tax Reform, Sewell said: "I applaud the President for outlining a bold framework for reforming the U.S. business tax system."

In 2019, Sewell worked with Ivanka Trump to develop policies related to paid parental leave.

Sewell wants to see the Military Widow's Tax eliminated.

Sewell has voted against work requirements for welfare recipients.

Voting rights 

In 2019, Sewell sponsored the Voting Rights Advancement Act (which later became the John Lewis Voting Rights Act), which would update the Voting Rights Act of 1965 by providing increased oversight of voting changes, updating the pre-clearance formula to oversee contemporary discrimination patterns, and expanding the Attorney General's power to send federal observers to jurisdictions in areas at risk of voting discrimination. In 2019, Sewell co-sponsored the For the People Act of 2019.

LGBT rights
Sewell voted for the Equality Act and the Respect for Marriage Act.

Tourism 
Sewell co-sponsored and voted for the National Heritage Area Act of 2022, which would create a National Heritage Area system and designate 19 counties in the Alabama Black Belt as a National Heritage Area.

Education

Sewell co-sponsored the Student Non-Discrimination Act in 2013 which, if enacted, would have protected LGBT students from anti-gay bullying and discrimination in public schools.

In 2019, she sponsored a bill, which passed, granting historically black colleges $70 million for capital improvements and to support their educational work.

Energy policy

Sewell opposes offshore drilling and opposes allowing the EPA to regulate greenhouse gas emissions.

Foreign policy
Sewell supported Obama's decisions on Afghanistan, citing "trust" of his policies. She was part of a bipartisan delegation that accompanied Nancy Pelosi on a two-day trip to Afghanistan in May 2012. While there, they spent time "with American service-members and meeting local officials to discuss security and women's issues."

Sewell opposed removing armed forces from Afghanistan in 2011.

Government reform

Sewell co-sponsored the STOCK Act in 2011 and the DISCLOSE Act in 2012. The same year, she also co-sponsored the SIMPLE Voting Act, to require a minimum of 15 days of nationwide early voting.

Gun policy

In 2019, Sewell voted for the Bipartisan Background Checks Act of 2019, requiring background checks on anyone seeking to buy a firearm.

Health care

Sewell voted for the Patient Protection and Affordable Care Act (Obamacare). She supports Medicaid expansion and offering incentives for states to do so. She is currently sponsoring bills to lower prescription drug costs, expand funding for rural hospitals, and to support more health studies on African American health disparities.

In March 2021, Sewell voted for the American Rescue Plan, which included $475 million in funding for Sewell's district including vaccination support, city employee overtime pay, and hazard pay for COVID-19 response work.

Homeland security

Sewell supported extending the PATRIOT Act's wiretapping. She voted against funding to support Trump's wall.

Kay Ivey

When Alabama governor Kay Ivey shared that she had performed in a college skit in blackface, Sewell called Ivey's actions "reprehensible" and "deeply offensive", adding that "racism – in any of its forms – is never acceptable, not in the 1960s and not now."

Impeachments of Donald Trump
In both the first and second impeachments of Donald Trump, Sewell voted in favor of articles of impeachment against Trump, the only representative from Alabama to do so.

Committee assignments
Sewell serves on the following House committees:
 Committee on Ways and Means
 Subcommittee on Health
 Subcommittee on Select Revenue Measures
 Subcommittee on Social Security

Caucus memberships
 Congressional Black Caucus
 New Democrat Coalition (vice chair)
 Congressional Voting Rights Caucus
Congressional Cement Caucus

Electoral history

Personal life
In 1998, Sewell married Theodore Dixie of Huntsville, Alabama. They are divorced.

Sewell is a lifetime member of Brown Chapel AME Church in Selma, Alabama.

She is the cousin of Briana Sewell, a delegate in the Virginia House of Delegates.

See also
 List of African-American United States representatives
 Women in the United States House of Representatives

References

External links

 Congresswoman Terri Sewell official U.S. House website
 Terri Sewell for Congress campaign website
 
 

|-

1965 births
21st-century American politicians
21st-century American women politicians
African-American lawyers
African-American members of the United States House of Representatives
African-American people in Alabama politics
Alabama lawyers
Alumni of St Hilda's College, Oxford
American women lawyers
Davis Polk & Wardwell lawyers
Democratic Party members of the United States House of Representatives from Alabama
Female members of the United States House of Representatives
Harvard Law School alumni
Lawyers from Birmingham, Alabama
Lawyers from Huntsville, Alabama
Living people
Politicians from Birmingham, Alabama
Politicians from Huntsville, Alabama
Politicians from Selma, Alabama
Princeton University alumni
Women in Alabama politics
Alpha Kappa Alpha members
21st-century African-American women
20th-century African-American people
20th-century African-American women
Marshall Scholars